Matabeleland South is a province in southwestern Zimbabwe. With a population of 683,893 as of the 2012 Zimbabwean census, it is the country's least populous province. After Matabeleland North, it is Zimbabwe's second-least densely populated province. Matabeleland South was established in 1974, when the original Matabeleland Province was divided into two provinces, the other being Matabeleland North. The province is divided into six districts. Gwanda is the capital, and Beitbridge is the province's largest town. The name "Matabeleland" is derived from Ndebele, the province's largest ethnic group.

Matabeleland South is bordered by Bulawayo and Matabeleland North to the north, Midlands to the northeast, Masvingo to the southeast, South Africa to the south, and Botswana to the west. It is the fourth-largest of the country's ten provinces in area. Matabeleland South sits on the edge of the Kalahari Desert, giving it an arid climate not hospitable to agriculture.

Economy

Its economy is largely centered around subsistence farming and livestock farming. Droughts and a lack of economic opportunities have resulted in widespread poverty and migration out of the province.

Transport

The province has an important geographical location which can link Botswana to Malawi or South Africa to south Zambia through Bulawayo, but due to lack of investment, the old transport hub of the late 20th century lost its familiarity and use with these two countries.

Geography
The province sits on the edge of the Kalahari desert, hence it is arid and very dry. The province shares borders with South Africa and Botswana. As a result, there are Tswana, Sotho/Pedi, Venda, Shangani (Tsonga) and the Khoisan speaking people in the province. The other languages that are native in the province are Ndebele and Kalanga.

Towns and villages 
Towns and villages in Matabeleland South include Antelope Mine, Beitbridge, Brunapeg, Colleen Bawn, Esigodini, Filabusi,Fort Rixon, Gwai, Gwanda, Kafusi, Kezi, Madlambudzi, Makhado, Maphisa, Masendu, Ndolwane, Plumtree, Shangani, Stanmore, Tshitshi, Bulu, West Nicholson, and Zezani.

Government and politics

Provincial government 
Matabeleland South is overseen by the Minister of State for Matabeleland South Province, a de facto governor who oversees provincial affairs and sits in the House of Assembly of the Parliament of Zimbabwe. The governor is appointed by the President of Zimbabwe and is not appointed to a set term. Historically, the governor held the title Governor of Matabeleland South, but the office has since been renamed to align with the 2013 Constitution of Zimbabwe, which does not allow for provincial governors.

The current Minister of State for Matabeleland South Province is Abednico Ncube, a ZANU–PF member who was appointed by President Emmerson Mnangagwa in December 2017.

Districts
Matabeleland South Province is divided into seven districts: Beitbridge, Bulilima, Gwanda, Insiza, Mangwe, Matobo, and Umzingwane.

National politics 

Like each of Zimbabwe's ten provinces, Matabeleland South Province is represented in the Senate by six senators, three of whom must be women. Senators are not directly elected by voters, but are instead selected by party lists via a proportional representation system. The province's current senators since the 2018 elections are Themba Mathuthu (ZANU–PF), Alma Mkwebu (ZANU–PF), Tambudzani Mohadi (ZANU–PF), Simon Khaya-Moyo (ZANU–PF), Bekithemba Mpofu (MDC Alliance), and Meliwe Phuthi (MDC Alliance).

Matabeleland South is represented by 13 Members of Parliament in the House of Assembly, Zimbabwe's lower house of Parliament. The province's current MPs since the 2018 elections are Patrick Dube, Ruth Mavhungu Maboyi, Levi Mayihlome, Obedingwa Mguni, Edgar Moyo, Abednico Ncube, Soul Ncube, Nqobizitha Ndlovu, Albert Nguluvhe, Dingumuzi Phuti, Madodana Sibanda, Spare Sithole, and Farai Taruvinga. All are members of ZANU–PF except for Dube, who represents the MDC Alliance.

See also
 Matabele people
 Bulawayo
 Provinces of Zimbabwe
 Districts of Zimbabwe

References

 
Provinces of Zimbabwe
1974 establishments in Rhodesia